The Indian Ambassador to the United States of America is the chief diplomatic representative of India to the United States, housed in the Embassy of India, Washington, D.C. The current ambassador is Taranjit Singh Sandhu who succeeded Harsh Vardhan Shringla in February, 2020 following Shringla's appointment as Foreign Secretary of India.

List of Indian Ambassadors to the United States

See also
 India–United States relations

References 

 India Ambassador, Official page indianembassy.org
 Embassay of India, Washington DC-Ambassadors of India to the United States

External links

 India Ambassador, Official page at Embassy of India, Washington, D.C.
 Ministry of External Affairs, Official website
 Ministry of External Affairs, Official Twitter handle

United States
India
1947 establishments in India